The Parliamentary Secretary to the Ministry of Pensions was a junior Ministerial office at Parliamentary Secretary rank in the British Government, supporting the Minister for Pensions.

Establishment and history
The office was established in 1916 and filled intermittently until 1932. It was established again from 1940, with joint holders from 1951. In 1944 a separate Ministry of National Insurance was formed and from 1945 until 1951 there was a Parliamentary Secretary to the Ministry of National Insurance. The two departments merged in 1953. In 1966 the department became the Ministry of Social Security, and the title of the Parliamentary Secretary post changed accordingly.

Parliamentary Secretaries to the Ministry of Pensions, 1916–1966

Parliamentary Secretaries to the Ministry of National Insurance, 1945–1951

Parliamentary Secretaries to the Ministry of Social Security, 1966–1968

Pensions
Defunct ministerial offices in the United Kingdom